Malaya Donshchinka is a rural locality (a khutor) in Perelazovskoye Rural Settlement, Kletsky District, Volgograd Oblast, Russia. The population was 72 as of 2010. There are 3 streets.

Geography 
Malaya Donshchinka is located in steppe, on the Donshchinka River, 61 km southwest of Kletskaya (the district's administrative centre) by road. Bolshaya Donshchinka is the nearest rural locality.

References 

Rural localities in Kletsky District